The 1978 European Figure Skating Championships was a senior-level international competition held in Strasbourg, France from January 31 to February 5. Elite senior-level figure skaters from European ISU member nations competed for the title of European Champion in the disciplines of men's singles, ladies' singles, pair skating, and ice dancing.

Competition notes
15-year-old Denise Biellmann became the first female skater to land the triple lutz in competition. She underrotated it, with two-foot landing. At the same event, she became the first woman to receive a 6.0 in technical merit, receiving the score from British judge Pauline Borrajo. She was 12th in figures, first in the free skating, and finished fourth overall. Another triple lutz was performed only by Jan Hoffmann.

Results

Men

Ladies

Pairs

Ice dancing

References

External links
 results

European Figure Skating Championships, 1978
European Figure Skating Championships, 1978
European Figure Skating Championships
International figure skating competitions hosted by France
Sports competitions in Strasbourg
20th century in Strasbourg
February 1978 sports events in Europe